Rajgamar is a census town in Korba district in the Indian state of Chhattisgarh.

Demographics
 India census, Rajgamar had a population of 12,595. Males constitute 51% of the population and females 49%. Rajgamar has an average literacy rate of 64%, higher than the national average of 59.5%: male literacy is 75%, and female literacy is 53%. In Rajgamar, 16% of the population is under 6 years of age.

References

Cities and towns in Korba district